Araç is a town in the Kastamonu Province in the Black Sea region of Turkey. It is the seat of Araç District. Its population is 6,464 (2021).

References

Populated places in Kastamonu Province
Araç District
Towns in Turkey